Morley is a township in the Canadian province of Ontario, located within the Rainy River District. The township had a population of 481 in the Canada 2016 Census.  Named after John Morley, it was formed in 1903 when the townships of Morley and Pattullo, as well as the village of Stratton, were amalgamated.

In 2004, the Township of Morley was greatly expanded through the addition of the geographic townships of Sifton and Dewart, that were previously part of Unorganized Rainy River District.

Demographics 

See also
List of townships in Ontario

References

External links 

Municipalities in Rainy River District
Single-tier municipalities in Ontario
Township municipalities in Ontario